David Francis Jull (4 October 1944 – 13 September 2011) was an Australian politician. He was a long-serving Liberal member of the Australian House of Representatives, representing the Division of Bowman, Queensland, from 1975 to 1983 and Fadden, Queensland, from 1984 to 2007.

Jull was born in Kingaroy, Queensland, and was educated at the Anglican Church Grammar School and the University of Queensland. He was an announcer on radio and television from 1963 to 1965 and then a director of television station TVQ, Brisbane until he entered politics. He was elected at the 1975 general election, but defeated in 1983.

He was Deputy General Manager of the Queensland Tourist and Travel Corporation 1983–84.

Jull was reelected to parliament at the 1984 election.  He was a member of the Opposition Shadow Ministry 1989–94, and was Minister for Administrative Services 1996–97. He resigned from the ministry following accusations that he had failed to prevent other MPs from abusing their parliamentary allowances.

Jull was chair of the Parliamentary Committee on the Australian Security Intelligence Organisation 1997–2002, and of its successor, the Parliamentary Joint Committee on Intelligence and Security (formerly the Parliamentary Joint Committee on ASIO, ASIS and DSD), since 2002. In this capacity he presided over the Committee's inquiry into the performance of the Australian intelligence services in relation to Iraq's weapons of mass destruction in 2003–04.

Health problems and death
Jull was diagnosed with lung cancer, and in 2005 underwent surgery to remove one of his lungs, He retired from Parliament at the 2007 election.

Jull died peacefully on 13 September 2011 in Brisbane, aged 66. He had no children. Jull was accorded a state funeral, which took place on 23 September.

References

1944 births
2011 deaths
Liberal Party of Australia members of the Parliament of Australia
Members of the Australian House of Representatives for Bowman
Members of the Australian House of Representatives for Fadden
People from Kingaroy
Place of death missing
Australian radio presenters
Australian television newsreaders and news presenters
People educated at Anglican Church Grammar School
21st-century Australian politicians
20th-century Australian politicians